Vargach may refer to:
 Vargach, Ilam
 Vargach, Kermanshah